{{Speciesbox 
| image = Indo-malayan Mountain Pitviper (Ovophis monticola convictus) (18085351724).jpg
| status = LC
| status_system = IUCN3.1
| status_ref = 
| genus = Ovophis
| species = monticola
| authority = (Günther, 1864)
| range_map = Ovophis monticola distribution.png
| synonyms = 
 Parias maculata - Gray, 1853
 Trimeresurus monticola - Günther, 1864
 Crotalus Trimeres[urus]. monticola - Higgins, 1873
 Trimeresurus monticola - Boulenger, 1890
 Lachesis monticola - Boulenger, 1896
 Trimeresurus monticola monticola - Mell, 1931
 Agkistrodon monticola - Pope, 1932
 Trimeresurus tonkinensis - Bourret, 1934 (possible nomen nudum)
 Trimeresurus tonkinensis - Bourret, 1934
 T[rimeresurus]. m[onticola]. tonkinensis - Deuve, 1970
 Trimeresurus monticola - Saint-Girons, 1972
 Ovophis monticola - Burger In Hoge & Romano-Hoge, 1981
 Ovophis monticola monticola - Hoge & Romano-Hoge, 1981
 Ovophis tonkinensis - Hoge & Romano-Hoge, 1981
 Ovophis tonkinensis - Golay et al., 1993
 Ovophis monticola monticola - Orlov & Helfenberger, 1997
}}Ovophis monticola, commonly known as the Chinese mountain pit viper, is a venomous pitviper species found in Asia. Currently, two subspecies are recognized, including the nominate subspecies described here. Recent taxonomic work suggests that most of these should be considered as separate species. IUCN has already evaluated O. m. makazayazaya as Ovophis makazayazaya.

Description
Total length of males 49 cm (19¼ inches), of females 110 cm (43¼ inches); tail length of males 8 cm (3⅛ inches), of females 15 cm (5⅞ inches).

The head has a short snout, a little more than twice the length of the diameter of the eye. The crown is covered by small scales rather than large shields, while the scales are usually smooth, feebly imbricate. The first upper labial is not fused to the nasal and is completely separated by a suture. The supraoculars are large, 5-9 scales in a line between them. The internasals are usually not in contact with one another, separated by 2 small suprapostrostral scales. There are 7-10 upper labials, the second of which is usually fused to the scale bordering the facial sensory pit anteriorly. The fourth and fifth upper labials are beneath the eye, but separated from orbit by a series of 2-4 small scales.

The body is stout. The dorsal scales are smooth or weakly keeled, in 23-25, occasionally in 19 or 21 longitudinal rows at midbody. Ventral scales and subcaudals (Myanmar, northeastern India and adjacent areas of China and Thailand) 137-176 and 36-62 respectively, subcaudals mixed paired and single, occasionally all unpaired (ventrals and subcaudals for southern China, Vietnam, Laos: 127-144 and 36-54, and Malaysian Peninsula: 133-137 and 22-28 respectively [fide Smith 1943:509]).

Common names
Mountain pitviper, mountain viper, Chinese pit viper, spotted pit viper, Arisan habu,  Chinese mountain pit viper.  Bengali name: পাহাড়ী বোড়া.

Geographic range
Found in Asia in Nepal, India (Assam, Sikkim, Mizoram, Nagaland), Bangladesh (already stated on the subspecies table), Myanmar, China (Zhejiang, Fujian, Sichuan, Yunnan, Tibet), Cambodia, Thailand, Laos, Vietnam, West Malaysia and Indonesia (Sumatra). The type locality is described as "Sikkim" (India).

Subspecies

Venom
Little is known about the venom of this species but it is presumed to contain hemorrhagins and procoagulants. There has been one recorded fatality from the bite of this species.

References

Further reading

 Günther, A. 1864. The Reptiles of British India. The Ray Society. London. (Taylor & Francis, Printers.) xxvii + 452 pp. (Trimeresurus monticola'', p. 388 + Plate XXIV., fig. B.)
 Tillack, F.; Shah, K.B.; Gumprecht, A. & Husain, A. 2003 Anmerkungen zur Verbreitung, Morphologie, Biologie, Haltung und Nachzucht der Berg-Grubenotter Ovophis monticola monticola (Günther, 1864) (Serpentes, Viperidae, Crotalinae). Sauria 25 (4): 29-46

External links
 

Crotalinae
Reptiles of Myanmar
Reptiles of Cambodia
Reptiles of China
Reptiles of India
Reptiles of Indonesia
Reptiles of Laos
Reptiles of Malaysia
Reptiles of Nepal
Reptiles of Taiwan
Reptiles of Thailand
Reptiles of Vietnam
Reptiles described in 1864
Taxa named by Albert Günther
Snakes of China
Snakes of Vietnam
Snakes of Asia